A crown is an emblem of a monarchy, a monarch's government, or items endorsed by it.

Crown or The Crown may also refer to:

Currency

Currencies
 Crown (currency)

Contemporary currencies
 Czech koruna
 Danish krone
 Faroese króna
 Icelandic króna
 Norwegian krone
 Swedish krona

Historical currencies
 Austrian krone
 Austro-Hungarian krone
 Bohemian and Moravian koruna
 Czechoslovak koruna
 Estonian kroon
 Hungarian korona
 Slovak koruna

Historical coins
 Crown (Australian coin)
 Crown (British coin), a British coin introduced in 1707
 Crown (English coin), an English coin introduced in 1526
 Crown, the French Écu
 Crown, the 5 Mark coin of the German gold mark

Dentistry
 Crown (dental restoration), a dental treatment
 Crown (tooth), a portion of a tooth

Monarchy and government
 Crown (heraldry), a depiction of a crown used in heraldry
 Crown, by metonymy, the term for a monarch or the form of government of a monarchy
 The Crown, the legal embodiment of monarchical governance in a realm of the Commonwealth of Nations
 Crown prosecutor, the state prosecutor in the Commonwealth of Nations jurisdictions
 Crown Estate, a collection of lands and holdings in the territories of England, Wales and Northern Ireland belonging to the British monarch as a corporation sole
 Crown Property Bureau, the quasi-government agency responsible for managing the property of the Monarchy of Thailand

Ancient Roman awards for individuals' starring roles in warfare

 Camp crown, in penetrating a camp
 Civic Crown, of a citizen 
 Grass Crown, of a city 
 Mural crown, in scaling city walls 
 Naval crown, in boarding an enemy ship

Music

Groups
 Carolina Crown Drum and Bugle Corps, a junior drum corps from South Carolina
 Crown the Empire, an American metalcore band
 Crowns (band), an English folk punk band
 The Crown (band), a Swedish death/thrash band

Albums
 Crown (Aja album), a 2021 album by Aja
 The Crown (album), a 2014 album by Z-Ro

Songs
 "Crown" (Azealia Banks song) (2017)
 "Crown" (Stormzy song) (2019)
 "Crown" (TXT song) (2019)
 "Crown", a song by Camila Cabello and Grey from Bright: The Album
 "Crown", a song by Kelly Rowland
 "Crown", a song by NEFFEX
 "The Crown", a song by Gary Byrd and the GB Experience
 "The Crown", a song by Gaza from No Absolutes in Human Suffering
 "Crowns", a song by Phinehas from Thegodmachine

Places and buildings
 Crown Wetlands, Cayman Islands
 The Crown (mountain), a mountain in the Karakoram of China
 Crown, Inverness, an area beside the city centre of Inverness
 Crown, Missouri, a community in the United States
 Crown, Pennsylvania
 The Crown, an indoor arena in Cincinnati, Ohio, U.S. now known as Heritage Bank Center
 The Crown, former name of the Crown and Anchor, Strand, a tavern in 18th-19th-century London
 The Crown, former name of The Flying Pig, an inn in Cambridge
 Crown Melbourne, Australia
 Crown Perth, Australia
 Crown Sydney, Australia

Vehicles
 Crown (automobile), a 1905 American automobile
 Pacer Crown, a show car by AMC
 Toyota Crown, an automobile model for Asian markets

Ships
 Crown (1793 ship) 
 MS Albatros or Crown, a cruise ship
 HMS Crown (1654), a 48-gun ship launched as Taunton
 HMS Crown (1782), a 64-gun third rate

Science
 Crown (anatomy), the top of the head
 Crown (botany), the branching leaf-bearing portion of a tree
 Crown ether, a cyclic chemical compound that consists of a ring containing several ether groups
 Crown group, the most recent common ancestor of a collection of species as well as all of that ancestor's descendants
 Hair whorl or crown

Brands and enterprises
 Crown (St. Paul's Churchyard), an historical bookseller in London
 Crown Equipment Corporation, an American manufacturer of forklifts
 Crown International (Crown Audio), an American manufacturer of audio electronics
 Crown International Pictures, a defunct American film company
 Crown Lager, an Australian beer
 Crown Liquor Saloon, a pub in Belfast
 Crown, an imprint of Crown Publishing Group
 Crown Royal, a Canadian whisky
 Crowns brand cigarettes, produced by Commonwealth Brands
 Crown Resorts, a hotel, casino, and resort company

Other uses
 Crown (manga)
 The Crown (TV series), about Queen Elizabeth II
 Crown graph, a type of undirected graph in graph theory
 Crown, the top or hinge of a bell
 Crown, the topmost part of a hat
 Crown, the cross-sectional shape of a road surface
 Crown (watch), the grooved knob or dial on the outside of a watch case
 Confederation of the Polish Crown, or The Crown, monarchist political party in Poland
 Crown, part of the muzzle of a gun barrel
 Crown cap, a type of bottle seal

See also
 Corona (disambiguation)
 Crowne
 Ford Crown Victoria
 Ford LTD Crown Victoria
 HMS Crown, a list of Royal Navy ships